Minuscule 346 (in the Gregory-Aland numbering), is a Greek minuscule manuscript of the New Testament. The manuscript palaeographically has been assigned to the 10th or 11th century. It is a member of Ferrar Group.

Text 

In Luke 11:4 it reads καὶ μὴ εἰσενέγκῃς ἡμᾶς εἰς πειρασμοί (with "temptations" in the plural), rather than καὶ μὴ εἰσενέγκῃς ἡμᾶς εἰς πειρασμόν (with "temptation" in the singular).

History 

Prior to the publication of Reuben Swanson's series "New Testament Greek Manuscripts", Swanson identified minuscule 1346 to be a member of Family 13. This manuscript is not enumerated in index of Novum Testamentum Graece.

Bibliography 
 Reuben Swanson, Title: New Testament Greek Manuscripts - Luke, Publisher: William Carey Int'l Univ Press (August 1, 1998), pp. ix.

Greek New Testament minuscules
10th-century biblical manuscripts
11th-century biblical manuscripts
Family 13